Rocha River or Kunturillu River (Quechua kunturillu black and white, Hispanicized spelling Condorillo, also Kundurillu, Kunturillo) which upstream is called Mayllanku (Maylanco) is a Bolivian river in the Cochabamba Department, Quillacollo Province. From the point of the confluence with the Arque River the river is called Caine River.

The river whose original name is Kunturillu owes its present name to Captain Martín de la Rocha who diverted the river in 1565.

Gallery

See also
 Ch'aki Mayu
 List of rivers of Bolivia

Sources and notes

 lib.utexas.edu Detailed map of the area
Rand McNally, The New International Atlas, 1993.

Rivers of Cochabamba Department